Fei River (淝河 or 淝水), the name given to a number of rivers around Anhui, China, may refer to:

 , a tributary of the Huai River, reputed to be the site of the Battle of Fei River
 , a river that flows through Hefei and into Chao Lake
 , a tributary of the Huai River that flows through Wabu Lake
 , a tributary of the Huai River that enters the Huai River at Fengtai

See also
 Battle of Fei River, AD 383, Anhui